St. Tammany Parish is a parish located in the U.S. state of Louisiana named after Tamanend, the legendary Lenape Chief of Chiefs and the "Patron Saint of America." At the 2020 census, the population was 264,570, making it the fourth-most populous parish in Louisiana. The parish seat is Covington. The parish was founded in 1810.

St. Tammany Parish is included in the New Orleans–Metairie metropolitan statistical area. St. Tammany Parish is one of the fastest-growing parishes in the state, along with Livingston and Ascension. The population has quadrupled since 1970, and is expected to double again by 2030, expecting to diversify the population of the parish. Though it was not heavily directly damaged by Hurricane Katrina, the community is growing in large part due to subsequent displacement of populations because of the shifting landscape in the larger Metropolitan area due to the recovery and subsequent climate change effects.

History

Pre-history
St. Tammany was originally inhabited by numerous Indian peoples, including the Colapissas, Bayou Goulas, Chickasaw, Biloxi, Choctaw and Pensacola nations (although Frederick S. Ellis, in his book St. Tammany Parish: L'autre Côté du Lac, claims that the regionally prominent Choctaw tribe did not arrive in the area until after it had begun to be settled by Europeans).

In 1699, Pierre Le Moyne d'Iberville, a French explorer, was the first European to visit the area of present-day St. Tammany Parish. While exploring lakes Pontchartrain and Maurepas, Iberville wrote in his journal, "The place where I am is one of the prettiest I have seen, fine level ground bare of canes. The land north of the lakes is a country of pine trees mixed with hard woods. The soil is sandy and many tracks of buffalo and deer can be seen."

West Florida
After the 18th-century founding and development of New Orleans, French settlers began to enter the region. The primary industry was the production of pitch, tar, turpentine and resin from the forests.

After France was defeated in the French and Indian War, St. Tammany (along with the other future "Florida Parishes") became part of British West Florida. During this period, the area comprising today's St. Tammany attracted British loyalists who wanted to escape persecution in the Thirteen Colonies. After Great Britain was defeated in the American Revolutionary War, West Florida was governed by the Spanish. The West Florida period ended with the West Florida revolt, which precipitated annexation by the United States.

Creation and naming of the parish
In 1810, President James Madison claimed West Florida as part of Louisiana and sent William C. C. Claiborne to claim the territory. Claiborne established the boundaries of the Florida Parishes.  He created St. Tammany Parish and named it after the Delaware Indian Chief Tamanend (c.1628-1698), who made peace with William Penn and was generally renowned for his goodness. Among the nine Louisiana parishes (counties) named for "saints" (see "List of parishes in Louisiana"), St. Tammany is the only one whose eponym is not a saint of the Roman Catholic Church, the ecclesiastical parishes of which formed the basis for the state's civil parishes. In fact, Tamanend is not known to have been a Christian, and was certainly not a Roman Catholic. However, he became popularly revered as an "American patron saint" in the post-Revolutionary period (long after his death).

Under Spanish rule, the area east of the Tangipahoa River, which would become St. Tammany Parish (and later Washington Parish to the north), was known as the St. Ferdinand District. Due to the fact that Ferdinand was also the name of the disputed King of Spain at the time, it was deemed that the new parish should have a more "American" sounding name.

19th century
In the early 1830s, there were only two towns in St. Tammany: Covington, a retreat with summer homes and hotels; and Madisonville, a shipbuilding and sawmill town. The area south of Covington to Lake Pontchartrain's northern shore and extending eastwards to the Pearl River border with the state of Mississippi was known as the Covington Lowlands. This region included the present-day towns of Mandeville, Abita Springs, Lacombe, Slidell, and Pearl River.

Mandeville was founded in 1834 by Bernard de Marigny de Mandeville and was developed as a health resort for wealthy New Orleanians, because it was believed that ozone was both salutary and naturally emitted by the numerous trees in the area (both beliefs later proven false), giving rise to an early name for the region — the "Ozone Belt".

Regular ferry service commenced across Lake Pontchartrain, and shortly thereafter another resort community was founded, Abita Springs. A railroad was constructed in the 1880s connecting Covington and Abita Springs to Mandeville and to New Orleans, allowing for further growth, particularly in Abita Springs, where underground spring waters permitted supposedly healthful baths.

20th century

With the completion of high-speed road connections to St. Tammany from New Orleans and its older suburbs (Lake Pontchartrain Causeway, the I-10 Twin Span Bridge), the parish began to develop as a bedroom community. Suburban sprawl first took root in and around Slidell, Louisiana, in the eastern part of the parish. Though the Causeway was completed in 1956 and linked suburban Metairie with western St. Tammany, growth in and around western St. Tammany towns like Mandeville, Covington, and Madisonville only gathered momentum in the late 1960s.

21st century
While St. Tammany was sparsely populated and almost wholly rural in the 1950s, its population exceeded 200,000 in the wake of Hurricane Katrina's landfall in 2005.

A major event in the parish's transition from a bedroom community of commuters to a more diverse and independent economic unit occurred in 2008 with the relocation of Chevron's regional corporate headquarters from downtown New Orleans to an office park outside of Covington.

Hurricane Katrina effects
Hurricane Katrina made its final landfall in eastern St. Tammany Parish. The western eye wall passed directly over St. Tammany Parish as a Category 3 hurricane  at about 9:45 AM CST, August 29, 2005. The storm surge impacted all  of St. Tammany Parish's coastline, including Lacombe, Mandeville and Madisonville. The surge had a second peak in eastern St. Tammany as the westerly winds from the southern eye wall pushed the surge to the east, backing up at the bottleneck of the Rigolets Pass.

The twin spans of I-10 bridges between Slidell and New Orleans East were virtually destroyed, and much of I-10 in New Orleans East was under water. The Lake Pontchartrain Causeway and the U.S. Highway 11 bridge, connecting the north and south shores of Lake Pontchartrain, were open only to emergency traffic.

Initial search and rescue operations were conducted south of U.S. Highway 190 from Lacombe east to the state line.  Fire District No. 1 and the St. Tammany Parish Sheriff's office evacuated over 3,000 people from flooded homes and rescued about 300 people in imminent danger.  Radio communications among first responders functioned throughout the rescue period, but the 9-1-1 system was not operational for ten days. Utility services were not available anywhere in the parish.  Generator power was available for hospitals and a special needs shelter.  Hospitals were running at capacity on generator power.

The hurricane-force winds toppled trees and telephone poles parish-wide, blocking all transportation routes. Land debris cleanup continued into 2007, with over 6.6 million cubic yards (5 million m3) collected. Debris cleaning in waterways continued at least through 2009.
Hurricane Katrina damaged 48,792 housing units in St. Tammany Parish from flood waters, high winds, or both.

Geography
It is located to the north of Lake Pontchartrain.

Major highways

  Interstate 12
  Interstate 59
  U.S. Highway 11
  U.S. Highway 90
  U.S. Highway 190
  Louisiana Highway 21
  Louisiana Highway 22
  Louisiana Highway 25
  Louisiana Highway 36
  Louisiana Highway 40
  Louisiana Highway 41

Adjacent counties and parishes
 Washington Parish  (north)
 Pearl River County, Mississippi  (northeast)
 Hancock County, Mississippi  (east)
 Orleans Parish  (south)
 Jefferson Parish (southwest)
 St. Bernard Parish (southeast)
 Tangipahoa Parish  (west)

National protected areas
 Big Branch Marsh National Wildlife Refuge
 Bogue Chitto National Wildlife Refuge (part)

State protected areas
 Pearl River Wildlife Management Area
 Lake Ramsey Savannah Wildlife Management Area

State parks
 Fairview-Riverside State Park
 Fontainebleau State Park

Communities

Cities 
 Covington (parish seat)
 Mandeville
 Slidell (largest municipality)

Towns 
 Abita Springs
 Madisonville
 Pearl River

Villages 
 Folsom
 Sun

Unincorporated areas

Census-designated places 
 Eden Isle
 Lacombe

Unincorporated communities 

 Alton
 Audubon
 Barker's Corner
 Big Branch
 Blond
 Bonfouca
 Bush
 Chinchuba
 Colt
 Crawford Landing
 Dave
 Davis Landing
 Florenville
 Goodbee
 Haaswood
 Houltonville
 Hickory
 Lewisburg
 Maude
 McClane City
 Morgan Bluff
 North Slidell
 Oaklawn
 St. Benedict
 St. Joe
 St. Tammany
 St. Tammany Corner
 Talisheek
 Waldheim
 White Kitchen

Demographics

Per the 2020 United States census, there were 264,570 people, 94,988 households, and 65,335 families residing in the parish. At the 2019 census estimates, there were 255,155 people living in the parish, up from 233,740 at the 2010 U.S. census, and 191,268 at the 2000 census. There were 92,962 households spread out among 102.909 housing units. The racial and ethnic makeup of the parish was 82.8% non-Hispanic white, 12.1% African American, 0.6% Native American, 1.6% Asian, 1.0% some other race, and 1.9% two or more races. Approximately 5.6% of the population was Hispanic and Latin American of any race.

Among the households, the median age was 40.2, and 6.0% of the population were under 5 years of age; 75.9% were aged 18 and older, and 16.4% were aged 65 and older. Culturally, 16.4% of the population were of French ancestry, and 15.5% were German. Irish heritage was 12.2% of the population, and Italians made up 11.3% of the parish. Sub-Saharan African heritage was 0.4% of the population in 2019. The second most-spoken language in St. Tammany Parish was Spanish (4.0%).

Among the population at the 2019 census estimates, 78.4% lived in owner-occupied housing units and the median home value was $218,500. The median gross rent was $1,086 and the median household income was $68,905. An estimated 11.5% of the population lived at or below the poverty line. The employment rate was 56.9%.

Religiously, Christianity has dominated the area since European colonization. Among the Christian denominations prevalent throughout the parish, Roman Catholicism has remained the largest with 145,007 members, followed by Baptists and non/inter-denominational Protestants per the Association of Religion Data Archives in 2020.

Politics
St. Tammany Parish has heavily favored Republican politicians. The last Democratic presidential candidate to carry the parish was John F. Kennedy in 1960. In 2008, John McCain received 76% of the vote (83,078 votes) in the parish, despite losing to Democrat Barack Obama nationally by a substantial margin. In the 2008 U.S. Senate election, incumbent Democrat Mary Landrieu was re-elected, but lost the parish to Republican John Kennedy, with Kennedy winning 61% of the vote (65,150 votes) in the parish to Landrieu’s 36% (39,429 votes). In 2004, Republican George W. Bush won 75% of the vote (75,139 votes) to Democrat John Kerry’s  24% (24,662 votes). The increase in the Republican margin of victory since 2004 has been attributed in part to the relocation of numerous, typically Republican, St. Bernard Parish residents to St. Tammany Parish in the aftermath of post-Hurricane Katrina.

Education

St. Tammany Parish Public Schools operates the public schools in all of the parish. They are consistently rated as among the highest-performing in the state.

St. Tammany Parish is within the service areas of two community colleges: Northshore Technical Community College and Delgado Community College. Northshore Technical Community College has its main campus in Lacombe; this campus was established in January 2017. Additionally Nunez Community College in Chalmette, and the Sidney Collier Campus in East New Orleans of Delgado Community College are in proximity to the parish. Previously Covington and Slidell hosted campuses of Delgado Community College, with Slidell having the Slidell Learning Center and later the Northshore-Slidell campus, and with Covington having the Northshore-Covington Campus. The latter opened in summer 2002. The Slidell campus closed in 2016 due to financial issues.

The parish is the eponym of Saint Tammany Hall on the campus of Southeastern Louisiana University, in neighboring Tangipahoa Parish.

See also

 Lake Pontchartrain
 National Register of Historic Places listings in St. Tammany Parish, Louisiana
 Tammany Trace

References

External links

 St. Tammany Parish Government official website
 St. Tammany Parish Public Schools
 Explore the History and Culture of Southeastern Louisiana, a National Park Service Discover Our Shared Heritage Travel Itinerary
 Water Resources of St. Tammany Parish United States Geological Survey
 St. Tammany Parish Sheriff's Office

Geology
 Heinrich, P. V., R. P. McCulloh, and J. Snead, 2007, Bogalusa 30 x 60 minute geologic quadrangle, Louisiana Geological Survey, Baton Rouge, Louisiana.
 Heinrich, P. V., R. P. McCulloh, and J. Snead, 2004, Gulfport 30 x 60 minute geologic quadrangle, Louisiana Geological Survey, Baton Rouge, Louisiana.
 McCulloh, R. P., P. V. Heinrich, and J. Snead, 2003, Ponchatoula 30 x 60 minute geologic quadrangle, Louisiana Geological Survey, Baton Rouge, Louisiana.

 
Louisiana parishes
Louisiana placenames of Native American origin
Parishes in New Orleans metropolitan area
1810 establishments in the Territory of Orleans
Populated places established in 1810